Micah Williams (born November 12, 2001) is an American sprinter.

His 9.91 Oregon school record qualified him as U.S. Olympian alternate in the 4 × 100 relay for the 2021 Olympics and attracted nationwide media interest.

He was gold medalist in the 4 × 100 relay in the 2018 IAAF World U20 Championships in Tampere, Finland.

At the 2022 USATF Golden Games, he recorded a wind-assisted time of 9.83.

Early life
Williams worked for Amazon during high school, where he was once told that he did not move fast enough when packing boxes.

Williams competed in the USA Junior Championships, finishing eighth (200 meter) in 2015, third (100) and fourth (200) in 2016, fourth (100) and fifth (200) in 2017 and fourth (100) in 2018. The latter year he also was fourth in the OSAA 6A state champion (100 and 200).

Career
In 2021, Williams became No. 7 collegiate all-time performer in the 60-meter dash (6.49 seconds). He was a three-time Gatorade Oregon Boys' Track and Field Runner of the Year while competing for Benson Polytechnic High School after setting the state meet record (10.42) and the state's all-time best 100m time (10.21).

As of 2022, his personal best in the 200-meter dash is 20.05.

In 2022, Williams set a new personal best of 9.86 in the 100-meter dash.

Personal records
 60 meters: 6.48 ( Spokane), January 25, 2022
 100 meters: 9.86 (+0.7 m/s) ( Fayetteville), May 27, 2022
 200 meters: 20.05 (0.0 m/s) ( Eugene), May 15, 2022

See also 
10-second barrier

References

External links
 Official website
 
 USATF bio
 Team USA bio

2001 births
Living people
American male sprinters
World Athletics U20 Championships winners
Sportspeople from Portland, Oregon
Track and field athletes from Portland, Oregon
Track and field athletes from Oregon
African-American male track and field athletes
21st-century African-American sportspeople